The UCI Road World Championships – Mixed team relay is a world championship for road bicycle racing in the discipline of team time trial. It is organized by the world governing body, the Union Cycliste Internationale (UCI).

The national teams have 6 riders per team, 3 women and 3 men. The team with the shortest time to complete both laps wins.

Medal winners

Medals by nation

References

 
Events at the UCI Road World Championships
Lists of UCI Road World Championships medalists
Recurring sporting events established in 2019